Suburban Girl is a 2007 American romantic comedy film directed by Marc Klein and produced by Gigi Pritzker and Deborah Del Prete. It stars Sarah Michelle Gellar and Alec Baldwin, with Maggie Grace, James Naughton, and Chris Carmack in supporting roles. It is adapted from the short stories "My Old Man" and "The Worst Thing a Suburban Girl Could Imagine" from Melissa Bank's 1999 best-selling book The Girls' Guide to Hunting and Fishing.

The film had its premiere at New York's Tribeca Film Festival on April 27, 2007. It was released on DVD and Blu-ray in the United States on January 15, 2008.

Plot
Brett Eisenberg is an ambitious yet unconfident New York City assistant book editor living in the literary hotbed of Manhattan's Upper East Side. Struggling to become a full-fledged editor, she is shocked when she learns that her mentor and boss is fired and replaced by the glamorous Faye Falkner. At a book signing, Brett meets the notorious and much older publishing playboy Archie Knox. After spending time with him she realises how unhappy she is with her immature boyfriend Jed and breaks off their relationship in order to pursue one with Archie.

Archie is an alcoholic, although he is almost three years sober, suffers from diabetes, and has an estranged daughter. The age gap between Brett and him is made clear through their different lifestyles, such as his lack of understanding how to use a Blackberry and Brett taking him to a candy shop. Although this does not affect their relationship in the beginning — Brett appreciates the advice and confidence he gives her to stand up to Faye — she soon begins to resent his patronizing attitude. Brett and Archie fight about him treating her like his daughter, and him not telling her that he used to date Faye. He eventually begins drinking again and sleeps with another woman in order to break off their relationship.

Brett is incredibly close to her father, explaining her situation to him and asking for his advice. While visiting her family home she is shocked to discover that he has cancer and that her family didn't tell her but told her brother Ethan, because her father felt she could not handle the news. Feeling depressed and unwell, Brett makes an awful impression on a celebrity client until Archie appears and rescues the situation. They decide to give their relationship another try and Brett introduces him to her family, who are uneasy with the age difference; her father especially after learning that Archie is an alcoholic when he is admitted to hospital. Brett's father tells her that she shouldn't have to spend her life taking care of Archie.

After her father dies, Brett realizes she must finally deal with her problems without his support. Archie proposes using the Blackberry that Brett bought him but she turns him down, telling him that they see each other as teacher and student and not as equals. She says she needs time to be happy and grow up on her own.

Brett, finally confident in herself, wears a pair of leather pants she was previously too scared to wear. She begins to edit her work in a decisive way by using a pen instead of a pencil, as she used to do throughout the film.

Cast
 Sarah Michelle Gellar as Brett Eisenberg
 Alec Baldwin as Archie Knox
 Maggie Grace as Chloe
 Vanessa Branch as Faye Faulkner
 James Naughton as Robert Eisenberg
 Peter Scolari as Mickey Lamm
 Chris Carmack as Jed Hanson
 Ebon Moss-Bachrach as Ethan Eisenberg
 Jill Eikenberry as Marlene Eisenberg
 Marian Seldes as Margaret Paddleford
 Marin Ireland as Katie
 Amad Jackson as Seaver

Production
The film was filmed in various locations around New York City as well as Toronto, Canada during the summer of 2006. It was produced by Odd Lot Entertainment in association with Catch 23 Productions. Deborah Del Prete, Gigi Pritzker and Daryl Taja served as producers.

During pre-production and filming, the makers of Suburban Girl used the title of the book, The Girls' Guide to Hunting and Fishing, for the project. However, director Francis Ford Coppola has the rights to the title and short story of that name, while his company American Zoetrope was to develop a film which was adapted from the book. The film's title was officially changed to Suburban Girl for its release.

Reception
The film received generally mixed reviews from critics. On Rotten Tomatoes, the film has a rating of 50%, based on 8 reviews, with an average rating of 6.1/10. It was described as "a blend of Sex and the City and The Devil Wears Prada" and a "pseudo-sophisticated romantic comedy" according to Variety.com. Pop Entertainment called the film "an intelligent romantic comedy that probably deserves a bigger audience than the straight-to-DVD tag will likely afford it [...] what is good about Suburban Girl for the most part outpaces its bad patches."

Gellar's onscreen chemistry with Baldwin was praised, with Eye for Film commenting, "The film works best when Baldwin and Gellar are together — aside from the fact that Gellar seriously needs to eat a bun or two." Film website moviepicturefilm.com stated "Gellar and Baldwin both give wonderful performances and make their chemistry incredibly real and ultimately, quite heartbreaking. Containing a ton of laughs and killer fashion that could give The Devil Wears Prada a run for its money, this movie has something uncommon in most romantic comedies, tons of style and a huge heart."

Soundtrack
No official soundtrack was released but tracks within the film include:

 "Love Song" — written and performed by Sara Bareilles
 "Smokin' Some Blues" — written and performed by Terance Jay
 "Silent Night" — written by Josef Mohr, performed by Terrance Jay
 "Start Being Nicer" — written by Ken Steen, performed by Torpedo Boys
 "Charm Attack" — written and performed by Leona Naess
 "Come to the Party" — written and performed by Sam Winch
 "Space Age Love Song" — written by Francis Maudsle et al., performed by Abra Moore
 "Having a Party" — written by Malissa Hunter and Billy J Stein, performed by Malissa Hunter
 "Funny Kind of Love" — written by Christopher Alan Livingston and Frank D Piazza, performed by Audio Paint
 "Your Love Beside Me" — written by Ray Greene et al., performed by Ray Greene
 "More Luck" — written by Ray Greene et al., performed by Ray Greene
 "Cause a Rockslide" — written by Damon Gough, performed by Badly Drawn Boy
 "Tokyo Boys" — written by Mladen Borosak and Tammy Plynn, performed by Running Red Lights
 "Concert Source" — written and performed by Drew Perrante
 "Speeding Cars" — written and performed by Imogen Heap
 "She Painted Pictures" — written by Liam Pickering, performed by Liam Frost
 "Slipping Under(Sing Along to Your Favorite Song)" — written and performed by William Tell
 "Cold Hearts" — written by Johan Andergard, performed by Club 8
 "No Fear" — written and performed by Melissa Tallon

References

External links
 
 
 
 
 Suburban Girl at Yahoo! Movies*
 

2007 films
2007 romantic comedy films
American romantic comedy films
Films based on American novels
Films based on short fiction
Films scored by Heitor Pereira
Films set in New York City
Films shot in New York City
Films shot in Toronto
Odd Lot Entertainment films
2007 directorial debut films
2000s English-language films
2000s American films